The long-nosed mole (Euroscaptor longirostris) is a species of mammal in the family Talpidae. It is endemic to China, where it has a widespread distribution.

Orlov's mole (E. orlovi) and Kuznetsov's mole (E. kuznetsovi), both of which range from southern China into northern Vietnam, were formerly considered populations of E. longirostris, but a 2016 described them as distinct species. The Yangtze River is thought to serve as the barrier separating E. longirostris from the two southern species, with E. longirostris only being found north of the Yangtze.

References

Mammals of China
Euroscaptor
Taxonomy articles created by Polbot
Mammals described in 1870

Endemic fauna of China